Canal 6 may refer to
Canal 6 (Salvadoran TV channel) in El Salvador
Canal 6 (Honduran TV channel) in Honduras
Canal 6 (Nicaraguan TV channel) in Nicaragua
Multimedios Television in Mexico, which also uses Canal 6 as a branding
Repretel 6, Canal 6 in Costa Rica